Marzena Cieślik (born 21 August 1981) is a Polish model.  Marzena Cieślik won the title of Miss Earth  Zachodniopomorska 2006 and later that year was crowned Miss Polonia 2006.  She was Poland's representative at Miss World 2006.

She featured in a photoshoot and on the cover of the Polish edition of Playboy in January 2009.

References

1981 births
Living people
Polish beauty pageant winners
Miss World 2006 delegates
Polish female models
People from Wolin (town)